John Hathaway Reed (January 5, 1921 – October 31, 2012) was the 67th Governor of Maine, holding office during the 1960s.  He was once an Aroostook County potato farmer.  Reed was a Republican who took office following the death of Governor Clinton Clauson.

Life and career
Reed was born in Fort Fairfield, Maine, in 1921.  He graduated from the University of Maine in 1942.  He served in the United States Navy in World War II, first graduating from Harvard's Navy Supply Corps School in 1944.

After coming home, he was elected to the Maine House of Representatives in 1954.  He served one term before being elected to the Maine Senate.  At the start of his second senate term, he was elected Senate President, an office which in Maine is first in line for the governorship.  Upon Clauson's death, Reed became governor and was the fourth Governor Maine had in 1959, after Clauson, Robert Haskell, and Edmund Muskie. He was then elected over Democrat Frank M. Coffin to finish Clauson's term in 1960.  He was narrowly reelected over Democrat Maynard C. Dolloff in 1962 to serve Maine's first 4-year term as governor. In 1966, he was defeated by Democrat Ken Curtis.

Reed was a strong supporter of the Vietnam War and was close to President Lyndon Johnson, a Democrat, who appointed him to the National Transportation Safety Board in 1966.  After serving in that post, he was appointed by President Richard Nixon, a Republican, US ambassador to Sri Lanka and the Maldives (shared country accreditation by ambassador). Reed was appointed ambassador to Sri Lanka and the Maldives a second time by President Ronald Reagan, a Republican, in 1981.

Reed lived in Washington, D.C., after his retirement.  He died there on October 31, 2012.

Marriage and children 
On March 24, 1944, Reed married Cora Mitchell Davison at the Newport Naval Chapel. Cora Davison was born on August 13, 1920, in Haverhill, Massachusetts, to John A. Davison and Ruth Hoitt.

Cora Davison was a graduate of Haverhill High School in 1938 and from the former McIntosh School of Business in Lawrence, in 1940. She worked as a secretary in the office of the Clarence Walker Shoe Factory in Haverhill prior to moving with her family to Newport, where she took a position as executive secretary to the commanding officer of the Newport Naval Supply Depot, during World War II. Here she met her future husband.

John and Cora had two daughters and three grandchildren:
 Cheryl Reed
 Ruth Ann Reed, married to Jerry Duford
 Reed Duford
 Drew Duford
 Curt Duford

His wife Cora died on November 7, 2004, at Washington Home and Hospice Center after a long illness.

References 

|-

|-

|-

|-

1921 births
2012 deaths
Ambassadors of the United States to Sri Lanka
Ambassadors of the United States to the Maldives
Chairman of the National Transportation Safety Board
Businesspeople from Maine
Farmers from Maine
Republican Party governors of Maine
Republican Party members of the Maine House of Representatives
People from Fort Fairfield, Maine
Presidents of the Maine Senate
Republican Party Maine state senators
University of Maine alumni
20th-century American businesspeople
United States Navy personnel of World War II
20th-century American diplomats
20th-century American politicians